G3 School (Gyan Ganga Global School) is a private primary and secondary school in Sonipat in the Delhi region in India.

Resources
The school is equipped with Smart Boards and online communication portals. Some of the resources for students include a music lab, computer labs, a science park, a library, and an audio-visual room. There are also  counselors and special education experts on the staff.

House system
The school has a house system aimed at fostering team spirit and healthy competition among students. The students are divided into four houses – Jaguar, Leopard, Panther and Puma. Each house is headed by a captain and a vice-captain, and a member of the staff serves as a house warden. All house activities and most school functions are organized by the house coordinator and assisted by the associate coordinators.

Activities
The school has activities and competitions spread out throughout the year. A few important events are Sports Day, Graduation Day, and Annual Day.

References

Private schools in Delhi